"Prison Sex" is a song by American rock band Tool. Frontman Maynard James Keenan wrote the lyrics. The song was released as their second single from their debut studio album Undertow. The song uses a modified drop-B tuning. The track features an "anti-climax" coda, in which memorable verses and choruses dissolve into an unrelated, quiet final section.

Music video
The video for "Prison Sex" was created with stop-motion animation techniques, and was directed by the band's guitarist Adam Jones (who had previous experience in art direction and animation, including work on the dinosaurs in Jurassic Park) and was edited by Ken Andrews. The video was removed from the MTV playlist due to its disturbing content. "Prison Sex" was also nominated for 1994's MTV Music Video Awards' Best
Special Effects category. The music video later showed on an episode of Beavis and Butt-head.

The video primarily revolves around a battered white humanoid, robotic-like doll figure trapped in a room full of cabinets that contain other humanoids, such as a caterpillar with the main humanoid's face, a jar with a wasp inside, a robotic character with a little child's face that twists and turns, and a being made out of what looks like meat and feces. During various points in the video the main character is confronted by a larger black humanoid who causes the doll to go catatonic. While catatonic, the black figure molests the doll with a paintbrush. In the beginning of the video, the black figure severs the doll's legs (even though they still move by themselves) and hangs them out of reach of the doll. By the end of the video, the doll subjects itself to the abuse by painting itself. In the final shot, it is revealed that the doll was in its own cabinet the whole time when the black figure closes the cabinet door.

Controversy
With the release of the 1993 single "Prison Sex" and its music video, directed and created by Adam Jones, MuchMusic called the band into question by deeming the video too graphic and offensive, later running an episode of its Too Much 4 Much series to discuss the video.

MTV stopped airing the "Prison Sex" video after a few viewings due to its symbolism depicting the sensitive subject of child abuse. Maynard James Keenan, who wrote the lyrics, has been quite clear in concerts about his dislike for his stepfather.

Before a live performance of "Prison Sex" on November 29, 1996 in Montreal, Quebec, Keenan stated:

"This song is about recognizing, identifying, the cycle of abuse within yourself. That's the first step of the process: realization; identifying. The next step is to work through it. But, this song is about the first step in the process, which is recognizing."

Track listing

UK version
 "Prison Sex"
 "Undertow" (live)
 "Opiate" (live)
 "Prison Sex" (radio edit)

German version
 "Prison Sex"
 "Intolerance" (live)
 "Undertow" (live)
 "Opiate" (live)

Australian
 "Prison Sex"
 "Intolerance" (live)
 "Undertow" (live)
 "Opiate" (live)
 "Prison Sex" (radio edit)

Promotional radio version
 "Prison Sex" (radio edit)
 "Prison Sex"

Release history

Chart performance

References

External links
The unofficial Tool FAQ

1993 singles
1993 songs
Animated music videos
Music video controversies
Obscenity controversies in music
Songs about child abuse
Songs about prison
Songs about sexual assault
Songs written by Maynard James Keenan
Songs written by Danny Carey
Songs written by Paul D'Amour
Songs written by Adam Jones (musician)
Stop-motion animated music videos
Tool (band) songs
Zoo Entertainment (record label) singles